Tie Me Down may refer to:
 "Tie Me Down" (New Boyz song), 2009
 "Tie Me Down" (Gryffin and Elley Duhé song), 2018